Alberta Provincial Highway No. 66, commonly referred to as Highway 66, is an east–west highway in central Alberta, Canada. In the east, Highway 66 begins at an intersection with Highways 22 and 762 south of the Hamlet of Bragg Creek and ends  to the west at the Little Elbow Recreation Area.  The highway provides access to the Easter Seals Camp Horizon and Elbow Falls.

Between December 1 and around mid-May, the western terminus of Highway 66 is located at the Elbow Falls turnoff. During this time, the length of the highway is shortened to

Major intersections 
From west to east:

References 

066